Jupiter is a planet in the Solar System, named after Jupiter, the chief god in Roman mythology.

Jupiter may also refer to:

Businesses
Jupiter Fund Management, a British fund management company
Jupiter Airlines, based in the United Arab Emirates
Jupiter (company), a Japanese game and hardware development studio
Jupiter Entertainment, an American television production company
Jupiter Band Instruments, a brand of woodwind, brass, and percussion instruments
Jupiter Hotel (Portland, Oregon), in the United States
Jupiter Discount Stores, a former brand designation of Kmart for old S.S. Kresge stores

Fictional characters
Sailor Jupiter or Makoto Kino, character in Sailor Moon
Commander Jupiter, character in Pokémon Diamond, Pearl, and Platinum
Johnny Jupiter, title character in early American television program produced by two works
Jupiter Jones:
from  Three Investigators juvenile detective book series
from 2015 science-fiction film Jupiter Ascending

Military
HMS Jupiter, six ships of the British Royal Navy
USS Jupiter, two ships of the United States Navy
French ship Jupiter (1789)
French ship Jupiter (1831)
Jupiter class minelayer, a four-ship class of Spanish mine layers which saw action in the Spanish Civil War
Operation Jupiter (disambiguation), military operations
Bristol Jupiter Fighter, an unsuccessful British biplane introduced in 1924
PGM-19 Jupiter, a U.S. Air Force medium-range ballistic missile, produced from 1956 to 1961
Jupiter Aerobatic Team, the Indonesian Air Force aerobatic display team

Music

Instruments
Jupiter Stradivarius, a violin
Jupiter, ex-Goding Stradivarius, a violin
Roland Jupiter (disambiguation), various analog music synthesizers

Groups
Jupiter (band), a Japanese power metal band

Works
"Jupiter" or Symphony No. 41, a symphony by Mozart
"Jupiter, the Bringer of Jollity", the fourth movement in The Planets, Gustav Holst's orchestral suite

Albums
Jupiter (Atheist album)
Jupiter (Cave In album)
Jupiter (Bump of Chicken album)

Songs
"Jupiter" (hymn) or "I Vow to Thee, My Country", a British patriotic song and Anglican hymn
"Jupiter" (Swallow the Moon), a song by Jewel from Spirit
"Jupiter" (Earth, Wind & Fire song)
"Jupiter" (Buck-Tick song)
"Jupiter", from the album Transistor by 311
"Jupiter", by Ayaka Hirahara
"Jupiter", by Minako Honda from Ave Maria
"Jupiter", from the album Freaked Out and Small by The Presidents of the United States of America
"Jupiter", from the album Planetarium by Sufjan Stevens, Bryce Dessner, Nico Muhly and James McAlister

Other
"Jupiter", a track on the album Interstellar Space by John Coltrane
Jupiter, disc 1 of Stadium Arcadium by the Red Hot Chili Peppers

People
Jupiter Apple (1968–2015), Brazilian singer
Jupiter Ghosh (born 1989), Bangladeshi cricketer
Jupiter Hammon (1711–before 1806), poet and first African-American writer to be published in the present-day United States
Jupiter Yves Ngangue (born 1980), Cameroonian former footballer

Places

United States
Jupiter, California, an unincorporated community
Jupiter, Florida, a town
Jupiter Island, a barrier island in Florida
Jupiter, North Carolina, an unincorporated community
Jupiter Township, Kittson County, Minnesota

Elsewhere
Jupiter, Romania, a summer resort on the Black Sea
Jupiter Glacier, Alexander Island, Antarctica
Jupiter Formation, a geologic formation in Quebec, Canada
Jupiter River, a river in Anticosti Island, Quebec, Canada
Jupiter Reef, a supposed, likely "phantom", reef in the South Pacific Ocean

Science and technology
Windows UI Library, code name "Jupiter" supports XAML controls for Windows Runtime
Jupiter JVM, the Java virtual machine
Jupiter, the first stable version of the elementary OS Linux distribution
Jupiter project, a DEC project for a PDP-10 replacement
JUPITER trial, a clinical trial investigating rosuvastatin
Jupiter (lens), a series of Soviet camera lenses
Polyura jupiter, a butterfly of the family Nymphalidae
Syntypistis jupiter, a species of moth of the family Notodontidae

Space and rocketry

Rockets: 
Jupiter-C, for sounding 
Jupiter-A
Jupiter (rocket family), a proposed family of space shuttle-derived launch vehicles
Jupiter (spacecraft), a proposed space tug being developed by Lockheed Martin
Mercury-Jupiter, the Jupiter variant of the Project Mercury rockets

Science fiction
Jupiter (novel), a 2000 novel by Ben Bova
Jupiter (magazine), edited by Ian Redman
Jupiter Award (science fiction award) for writing (presented infrequently from 1974 to 1978)
Jupiter 2, a spaceship in the television series Lost in Space

Transportation
, various ships
MS Jupiter, a cruiseferry
Jupiter (tugboat), preserved in Philadelphia, Pennsylvania
Jupiter (locomotive), a steam-powered locomotive
Jowett Jupiter, a sports car 
Moynet Jupiter, unsuccessful executive airplane model, introduced 1963
Bristol Jupiter, a British radial aeroplane engine, developed during First World War
Júpiter (Mexico City Metrobús), a BRT station in Mexico City
TVS Jupiter, a scooter manufactured by TVS Motor Company

Other uses
CE Júpiter, a Spanish football club based in Barcelona
Jupiter (ice hockey team), a defunct team that was based in Kharkiv, Ukraine
Jupiter (roller coaster), a wooden roller coaster in Beppu, Ōita, Japan
Jupiter (apple), an apple cultivar
Jupiter grape, an interspecific seedless Muscat grape
Jupiter (given name)
Jupiter Community High School, Jupiter, Florida
Jupiter Christian School, Jupiter, Florida
Jupiter field, a natural gas and oil field in the Atlantic Ocean off Brazil
GSP Jupiter, a drilling rig in the Black Sea
Jupiter, an award presented at the L'International des Feux Loto-Québec fireworks festival
Winter Storm Jupiter, a 2017 U.S. storm

See also

Jupiter Amphitheatre, a valley in Victoria Land, Antarctica
Jupiter and Lake Worth Railway in Florida
Project Jupyter, nonprofit computing organization
Jupiters, a Pakistani music band
Jupiters Hotel & Casino (of Gold Coast, Queensland, Australia; now rebranded as The Star Gold Coast)
Jupiters Limited, Australian gambling company that merged with Tabcorp
Jupiler, a Belgian beer